Lengel may refer to:

Persons
David Lengel, American journalist
Edward G. Lengel, American historian

Institutions
D.H.H. Lengel Middle School